Duncan Millar VC also known as Miller (19 June 1824 – 15 July 1881) was a Scottish born recipient of the Victoria Cross,the highest and most prestigious British honour. The award was for gallantry in the face of the enemy.

He was 34 years old and a private in the 42nd Regiment, (later The Black Watch (Royal Highlanders), British Army during the Indian Mutiny when the following deed took place on 15 January 1859 at Maylah Ghat, British India for which he and Private Walter Cook were awarded the VC:

His Victoria Cross is displayed at the National War Museum of Scotland, Edinburgh Castle, Edinburgh, Scotland.

References

Monuments to Courage (David Harvey, 1999)
The Register of the Victoria Cross (This England, 1997)
Scotland's Forgotten Valour (Graham Ross, 1995)

External links
Location of grave and VC medal (Glasgow)

British recipients of the Victoria Cross
Black Watch soldiers
1824 births
1881 deaths
Indian Rebellion of 1857 recipients of the Victoria Cross
People from Kilmarnock
British Army personnel of the Crimean War
British Army recipients of the Victoria Cross